The National Science and Technology Center for Disaster Reduction (NCDR) is the agency under the Ministry of Science and Technology (Taiwan) serving as the technical adviser to the Executive Yuan on disaster prevention and reduction affairs.

History
The legal basis for the establishment of the agency was the Disaster Prevention and Protection Act enacted in 2000. The agency was officially established in July 2003. In 2014, it became an administrative entity under the Ministry of Science and Technology.

Organizational structure
Meteorology Division
Flood and Drought Disaster Reduction Division
Slopeland Disaster Reduction Division
Earthquake Disaster Reduction Division
Technology and Manmade Disaster Reduction Division
Management System and Policy Division
Socio-Economic System Division
Information Division
Planning Division
Administration Division

Transportation
NCDR building is accessible within walking distance North of Dapinglin Station of Taipei Metro.

References

2003 establishments in Taiwan
Organizations established in 2003
Science and technology in Taiwan